Bruce Long (born 23 April 1950) is a South African former cricketer. He played in ten first-class and three List A matches for Border from 1971/72 to 1974/75.

See also
 List of Border representative cricketers

References

External links
 

1950 births
Living people
South African cricketers
Border cricketers
People from Graaff-Reinet
Cricketers from the Eastern Cape